Kevin Dellar (born 28 May 1937) is a former Australian rules footballer who played with Essendon in the Victorian Football League (VFL). Before being recruited to Essendon, Dellar played for several country clubs, including Seymour, Wangaratta Rovers, North Gambier and Horsham. He returned to Horsham, who he also later coached, after one season with the Bombers. Dellar was also captain-coach of Miga Lake, played for Noradjuha and was coach of St Michael's. His last involvement in football was as president of the Horsham & District Football League.

Notes

External links 		
		

Essendon Football Club past player profile

		
		

1937 births
Living people
Australian rules footballers from Victoria (Australia)
Essendon Football Club players
Horsham Football Club players
Seymour Football Club players
Wangaratta Rovers Football Club players
Western Border Football League players